Samuel F. Dale House is a historic home located at Franklin, Venango County, Pennsylvania.
  It was built in 1875, and is a large two-story, brick dwelling in the Second Empire style. It has a gabled wing with solarium and sleeping porch. It features a slate covered mansard roof, two-story projecting bay, and porches across the front and rear facades.  Also on the property is a contributing carriage house converted to a garage.

It was listed on the National Register of Historic Places in 1975.

References

Houses on the National Register of Historic Places in Pennsylvania
Second Empire architecture in Pennsylvania
Houses completed in 1875
Houses in Venango County, Pennsylvania
National Register of Historic Places in Venango County, Pennsylvania